The second USS Itasca (SP-810), later USS SP-810, was a United States Navy patrol vessel in commission from 1917 to 1919 which was employed as a hospital boat.

Itasca was built as a private wooden motorboat of the same name in 1908 by the Stamford Motor Construction Company at Stamford, Connecticut. In 1917, the U.S. Navy leased her from her owner, Henry Henke, for use as a section patrol boat during World War I. Sources differ on her commissioning date, claiming both that the Navy took control of her from Henke at Norfolk, Virginia, on 10 August 1917 and commissioned her as USS Itasca (SP-810) on 18 August 1918, and that she was commissioned in July 1917.

Although armed for use as a patrol boat, Itasca served as a hospital boat in the Norfolk area for the rest of World War I and into early 1919. She was renamed USS SP-810 in April 1918.

SP-810 was returned to Henke on 26 February 1919.

Notes

References

Department of the Navy Naval History and Heritage Command Online Library of Selected Images: Civilian Ships: Itasca (Motor Boat, 1908); Served as USS Itasca (SP-810) and USS SP-810, 1917-19
NavSource Online: Section Patrol Craft Photo Archive Itasca (SP 810)

Patrol vessels of the United States Navy
World War I patrol vessels of the United States
Hospital ships of the United States Navy
World War I auxiliary ships of the United States
Ships built in Stamford, Connecticut
1908 ships